The Bermudian cricket team is the team representing Bermuda in the sport of cricket, governed by the Bermuda Cricket Board. The Bermuda Cricket Board was elected to Associate Membership of the International Cricket Council, the global ruling body for the sport, in 1966. They finished fourth in the 2005 tournament, thus qualifying for their first and only World Cup in 2007.

Cricket World Cup Record

World Cup Record (By Team)

2007 Cricket World Cup

Bermuda qualified for their first Cricket World Cup in 2007, and were drawn against Bangladesh, India and Sri Lanka. They lost all three matches, and failed to qualify for the Knockout stage.

See also
Bermuda national cricket team
Cricket in Bermuda

References

Cricket in Bermuda
Bermuda in international cricket
History of the Cricket World Cup